Ammobatoides is a genus of bees belonging to the family Apidae.

The species of this genus are found in Europe and Western Asia.

Species:

Ammobatoides abdominalis 
Ammobatoides braunsi 
Ammobatoides luctuosus 
Ammobatoides okalii 
Ammobatoides radoszkowskii
Ammobatoides rubescens 
Ammobatoides schachti 
Ammobatoides scriptus

References

Apidae